Sir Edward Stradling, 5th Baronet (11 April 1672 – 5 April 1735) was a Welsh landowner and politician and a baronet in the peerage of England.

He was the eldest surviving son of Sir Edward Stradling, 4th Baronet of St Donat's Castle, Glamorganshire and educated at Christ Church, Oxford. He succeeded his father in 1685.

Career

Stradling was Member of Parliament for Cardiff, 1698, 1700–01, 1710–22, and Sheriff of Glamorgan, 1709–10.

He died in 1735, having married Elizabeth, the daughter of Sir Edward Mansel, 4th Baronet, M.P., of Margam, Glamorganshire, with whom he had two sons. The elder son, Edward, predeceased him in 1726, and the younger son and heir, Sir Thomas, who died in mysterious circumstances in Montpelier (France) in 1738, was the last Stradling of St Donat's. 

As a result of an understanding between Thomas Stradling and his friend Sir John Tyrwhitt, whereby each promised the other his inheritance in the event of his death, St Donat's passed to the Tyrwhitts.

References

1672 births
1735 deaths
Alumni of Christ Church, Oxford
High Sheriffs of Glamorgan
Baronets in the Baronetage of England
English MPs 1698–1700
English MPs 1701
Members of the Parliament of England (pre-1707) for constituencies in Wales
Members of the Parliament of Great Britain for Welsh constituencies
British MPs 1710–1713
British MPs 1713–1715
British MPs 1715–1722